The Slovak television series Oteckovia consists of 5 seasons, plus one special program.
Oteckovia started airing on January 1, 2018 on Markíza. The series renowned for Christmas special program dedicated to Christmas. Markíza halted broadcasting the series in mid-2020, in response to COVID-19 pandemic precautions. As a result, the series available for four days, excluding Fridays, on March 13, 2020, and ultimately reduced broadcasting days up to Wednesday, during the first segment of season 3. Oteckovia's seasons composed of two segments. The season 5 was premiered on January 10, 2022.

Series overview

Parts

References

Slovak television series